The Best of Michael Franks: A Backward Glance is a jazz vocal album by Michael Franks released in 1998 with Warner Bros. It is Franks' sixteenth album, and his second compilation after his import-only Indispensable: The Best of Michael Franks released a decade prior.

The compilation contains a selection of tracks spanning almost two decades, from The Art of Tea in 1976, to Abandoned Garden in 1995.

Track listing

Reception

Writing for AllMusic, Stephen Thomas Erlewine commented that "[a]ny curious listener looking for a one-stop introduction to Franks would be well served with this collection".

References

Bibliography

Michael Franks (musician) compilation albums
1998 compilation albums
Warner Records compilation albums